Petr Punčochář (born June 8, 1983) is a Czech professional ice hockey player. He was selected by the Chicago Blackhawks in the 6th round (186th overall) of the 2001 NHL Entry Draft.

Puncochar played with HC Vítkovice in the Czech Extraliga during the 2010–11 Czech Extraliga season.

Career statistics

Regular season and playoffs

International

References

External links

1983 births
Czech ice hockey defencemen
Chicago Blackhawks draft picks
HC Vítkovice players
Living people
People from Tábor
Sportspeople from the South Bohemian Region
Czech expatriate ice hockey people
Czech expatriate sportspeople in France
Expatriate ice hockey players in France